The Cayman Islands Open 2011 is the women's edition of the 2011 Cayman Islands Open, which is a tournament of the WSA World Series event Gold (Prize money: $68,500). The event took place in Grand Cayman in the Cayman Islands from 3 to 9 April. Nicol David won her third Cayman Islands Open trophy, beating Jenny Duncalf in the final.

Prize money and ranking points
For 2011, the prize purse was $68,500. The prize money and points breakdown is as follows:

Seeds

Draw and results

See also
WSA World Series 2011
Cayman Islands Open

References

External links
WSA Cayman Islands Open Squash Championships website
WISPA Cayman Islands Open Squash Championships website
Cayman Islands Open 2011 Squashsite website

2011 in squash
2011 in Caymanian sport
Squash in the Cayman Islands
Squash tournaments